Auna is an integrated healthcare provider with operations in Peru and Colombia. It counts with over 7,500 collaborators in its network.

Auna was absorbed in 2005 by the operator ONO.

Operations in Peru 
In Peru, it operates several private hospitals, clinics, and wellness centers. This network includes Clinica Delgado, one of Peru’s largest private hospitals, with a focus on high-complexity procedures, emergency care, gynecology and maternity.

Auna also operates Oncosalud, a prepaid plan covering oncological prevention and treatment, with over 1 million affiliates.

Operations in Colombia 
In Colombia, it owns Grupo Las Americas, a conglomerate operating a leading high-complexity hospital in Medellin, Clinica Las Americas.

It also operates a large oncology institute, Instituto de Cancerología, and Clínica Portoazul, a premium high-complexity hospital in Barranquilla, the country’s 4th largest market.

References 

Companies disestablished in 2005
Cable television companies of Spain